Group C of the 2004 Copa América was one of the three groups of competing nations in the 2004 Copa América. It comprised Brazil, Chile, Costa Rica, and Paraguay. Group play ran from 8 to 14 July 2004.

Paraguay won the group and faced Uruguay—the best-ranked third-placed team—in the quarter-finals. Brazil finished second and faced Mexico—the winners of Group B—in the quarter-finals. Costa Rica finished third and faced Colombia, the winners of Group A, in the quarter-finals. Chile finished fourth in the group, and were eliminated from the tournament.

Standings

All times are in local, Peru Time (UTC−05:00).

Matches

Costa Rica vs Paraguay

Brazil vs Chile

Brazil vs Costa Rica

Paraguay vs Chile

Costa Rica vs Chile

Brazil vs Paraguay

External links
Copa América 2004 Official Site

Group C
Brazil at the 2004 Copa América
Chile at the 2004 Copa América
2004 in Paraguayan football
2003–04 in Costa Rican football